Elizabeth Tchou (born September 25, 1966 in Medford, New Jersey) is a former field hockey defender from the United States and is currently working for the USA Field Hockey Association as Manager of Youth Development. Tchou was a member of the US women's team that finished fifth at the 1996 Summer Olympics in Atlanta, Georgia.

Tchou was raised in Medford Lakes, New Jersey and attended Shawnee High School.

Tchou graduated from the University of Iowa, where she played for the Hawkeyes. A four-time all-Big Ten midfielder, she earned All-America status in 1987 and was a part of the NCAA All-Tournament Team that same year. Tchou was a part of three Big Ten championships and three NCAA Final Four teams, including the 1986 national championship squad.

References

External links
 
 USA Field Hockey

1966 births
Living people
American female field hockey players
Duke Blue Devils field hockey coaches
Field hockey players at the 1996 Summer Olympics
Iowa Hawkeyes field hockey players
North Carolina Tar Heels field hockey coaches
Olympic field hockey players of the United States
People from Medford, New Jersey
People from Medford Lakes, New Jersey
Rutgers Scarlet Knights field hockey coaches
Shawnee High School (New Jersey) alumni
Sportspeople from Burlington County, New Jersey
Temple Owls field hockey coaches
Virginia Cavaliers field hockey coaches